Skylark is an album by pianist George Cables recorded in 1995 and released on the Danish label, SteepleChase.

Reception 

Ken Dryden of AllMusic stated "George Cables made a series of excellent CDs for Steeplechase during the 1990s, one of which is Skylark, a fun trio studio session".

Track listing 
 "Fungii Mama" (Blue Mitchell) – 6:26
 "Fee-Fi-Fo-Fum" (Wayne Shorter) – 9:36
 "Manhã de Carnaval" (Luiz Bonfá) – 7:39
 "Skylark" (Hoagy Carmichael, Johnny Mercer) – 8:20
 "Samba de Orfeu" (Bonfá) – 7:06
 "Someday My Prince Will Come" (Frank Churchill, Larry Morey) – 8:43
 "A Felicidade" (Antônio Carlos Jobim) – 5:52
 "Pannonica" (Thelonious Monk) – 6:53
 "Dolahin" (George Cables) – 6:40

Personnel 
George Cables – piano
Jay Anderson – bass
Albert "Tootie" Heath – drums

References 

George Cables albums
1996 albums
SteepleChase Records albums